Bones, Inc. is a Japanese animation studio. It has produced numerous series, including RahXephon, No. 6, Wolf's Rain, Scrapped Princess, Eureka Seven, Angelic Layer, Darker than Black, Soul Eater, Ouran High School Host Club, both the 2003 and 2009 adaptations of Fullmetal Alchemist, Star Driver, Gosick, Mob Psycho 100, Space Dandy, Noragami, Bungo Stray Dogs, and My Hero Academia. Its headquarters are located in Igusa, Suginami, Tokyo.

History
Bones was founded by Sunrise staff members Masahiko Minami, Hiroshi Ōsaka and Toshihiro Kawamoto in October 1998. One of their first projects was collaborating with Sunrise on Cowboy Bebop: Knockin' on Heaven's Door, a feature film based on the Cowboy Bebop anime series.

In 2007, the studio suffered the loss of co-founder Hiroshi Ōsaka, well known for his works as character designer on series such as Mobile Suit Victory Gundam, Mobile Fighter G Gundam and The Mars Daybreak. Ōsaka had been battling with cancer, and died from the disease on September 24, 2007. He was 44 years old.

Since the death of Ōsaka, two new additions have been made to the studio's board of directors: Makoto Watanabe and Takahiro Komori. Komori is well known as a character designer and animator who has been with the studio since its inception. His previous works as designer consist of Angelic Layer, Scrapped Princess, and Darker than Black.

Studios
Like studio Sunrise, where some of its founders previously worked, Bones is divided into smaller studios which are focused on their own anime projects.

Studio A: Led by producer Naoki Amano and mainly known for Gosick, Wolf's Rain, Angelic Layer, Hiwou War Chronicles, Noragami and Carole & Tuesday.

Studio B: Mainly known for Eureka Seven, RahXephon, Space Dandy, and Mob Psycho 100.

Studio C: Led by producer Yoshihiro Oyabu; It's known for Fullmetal Alchemist, Darker than Black: The Black Contractor, Soul Eater and Ouran High School Host Club. It's currently working exclusively on My Hero Academia.

Studio D: Led by Mari Suzuki and mainly known for Fullmetal Alchemist: Brotherhood and No. 6. Since 2015, it works on Bungo Stray Dogs.

Studio E: The newest studio, led by Makoto Watanabe and mainly known for the Eureka Seven: Hi-Evolution trilogy.

Productions

Anime television series

Anime films

Original net animation

Original video animation
RahXephon Interlude: Her and Herself/Thatness and Thereness (August 7, 2003)
Wolf's Rain (January 23, 2004 – February 25, 2004)
Fullmetal Alchemist: Premium Collection (March 29, 2006)
Ghost Slayers Ayashi: Ayashi Diving Comedy (22 August 2007 – 24 October 2007)
Darker than Black: Beneath the Fully Bloomed Cherry Blossoms (March 26, 2008)
Fullmetal Alchemist Brotherhood (August 26, 2009 – August 25, 2010)
Prototype (part of Halo Legends) (2010)
Darker than Black: Gaiden (27 January 2010 – 21 July 2010)
Eureka Seven Ao: The Flowers of Jungfrau (20 September 2012)
Noragami (February 17, 2014 - July 17, 2014)
Hitsugi no Chaika (March 10, 2015)
Noragami Aragoto (November 17, 2015 - March 17, 2016)
Snow White with the Red Hair (January 5, 2016)
Blood Blockade Battlefront (June 3, 2016)
Eureka Seven Ao:Final (January 2017)  
Bungo Stray Dogs (August 31, 2017)
Mob Psycho 100 Reigen -The Miraculous Unknown Psychic- (March 18, 2018)
My Hero Academia - All Might: Rising (February 13, 2019)
Mob Psycho 100: The Spirits and Such Consultation Office's First Company Outing ~A Healing Trip that Warms the Heart~ (September 25, 2019)
SK8 the Infinity (TBA)

Video games
Robot Alchemic Drive (Enix, November 4, 2002)
Rahxephon Blu Sky Fantasia (Bandai, August 7, 2003)
Fullmetal Alchemist and the Broken Angel (Square Enix, December 25, 2003)
Fullmetal Alchemist: Stray Rondo (Bandai, March 25, 2004)
Fullmetal Alchemist: Sonata of Memories (Bandai, July 22, 2004)
Fullmetal Alchemist 2: Curse of the Crimson Elixir (Square Enix, September 22, 2004)
Fullmetal Alchemist 3: The Girl Who Succeed God (Square Enix, July 21, 2005)
Eureka Seven vol. 1: The New Wave (Bandai, October 27, 2005)
Eureka Seven vol. 2: The New Vision (Bandai, May 11, 2006)
Fullmetal Alchemist: Prince of the Dawn (Square Enix, August 13, 2009)
Fullmetal Alchemist: Daughter of the Dusk (Square Enix, December 10, 2009)
Liberation Maiden (Part of Guild01; Level-5, May 31, 2012)
Professor Layton vs. Phoenix Wright: Ace Attorney (Capcom/Level-5, November 29, 2012)
Phoenix Wright: Ace Attorney - Dual Destinies (Capcom, July 25, 2013)
Persona 4: Dancing All Night (Atlus, June 25, 2015)

Music videos
Lotte music video - Shinsekai by Bump of Chicken (December 11, 2018)
Pokémon Special Music Video「GOTCHA！」- Acacia by BUMP OF CHICKEN (Pokémon/Nintendo/Creatures Inc./GAME FREAK inc., September 29, 2020)

Notes

References

External links 

  
 

 
Animation studios in Tokyo
Crunchyroll Anime Awards winners
Japanese animation studios
Japanese companies established in 1998
Mass media companies established in 1998
Suginami